Madan Lal Saini  (13 July 1943 – 24 June 2019) was an Indian politician who was the former Member of Parliament in the Rajya Sabha until his death. He hailed from the state of Rajasthan. He was a former MLA in Udaipurwati constituency from Rajasthan. He was a leader of the Bharatiya Janata Party. He was serving as President of Rajasthan State BJP until his death.

References

1943 births
2019 deaths
Rajya Sabha members from Rajasthan
Members of the Rajasthan Legislative Assembly
Bharatiya Janata Party politicians from Rajasthan
People from Jhunjhunu district